Buaran Station (BUA) is a class III railway station located in Jatinegara, Cakung, East Jakarta. The station, which is located at an altitude of +11 m, is included in the Jakarta Operational Area I and only serves the KRL Commuterline route.

Building and layout 

This station has 4 railway tracks.

Since 9 November 2018, this station has used a new building with a futuristic minimalist modern architecture which is located some distance to the west of the old building, to be precise to the west of the Jl. dr. Radjiman Wedyodiningrat. This new station is integrated with the Flyover Raden Inten TransJakarta bus station which serves corridor 11. This relocation changed the layout of the railway track, which was originally flanked by two side platforms into one island platform between the two tracks.

Services
The following is a list of train services at the Buaran Station.

Passenger services 
 KAI Commuter
  Cikarang Loop Line (Full Racket)
  Cikarang Loop Line (Half Racket), to / (via  and ) and

Supporting transportation

Gallery

References

External links 
 

East Jakarta
Railway stations in Jakarta